Nippon Steel Yahata Soccer Club (新日本製鐵八幡サッカー部 Shin-Nihon Seitetsu Yahata Sakkā-Bu) was a Japanese football club based in Kitakyushu, Fukuoka Prefecture.

History
Yahata Steel S.C. was founded in 1950 as the works team of the Yahata Steel company, which in 1970 merged with Fuji Steel to become Nippon Steel. During the 1960s the club provided the Japan national football team with many quality players which strengthened the squad for the 1964 and 1968 Olympic tournaments.

Yahata Steel was one of the original eight clubs that founded the Japan Soccer League (JSL) in 1965 ("Original Eight"), and building on its Emperor's Cup win in 1964, it was runner-up of the JSL to Toyo Industries (current Sanfrecce Hiroshima) in 1965 and 1966. In 1981, however, after an uneventful decade in which the club did not win any honours nor was in danger of relegation, Nippon Steel was relegated to Division 2 and never played top flight football again. In 1990 they were relegated yet again, this time leaving the JSL for good after 26 seasons. They thus joined the Kyushu Soccer League. The 1999 season was the last with Nippon Steel Yahata in the Kyushu league.

In 2007, New Wave Kitakyushu (current Giravanz Kitakyushu), formerly part of Mitsubishi Chemical, assumed the mantle of representative of Kitakyushu in the national football leagues by earning promotion to the Japan Football League.

1950–1970: Yahata Steel SC
1970–1991: Nippon Steel SC
1991–1999: Nippon Steel Yahata SC

Honours 
Emperor's Cup: 1964 (shared with Furukawa Electric)
All Japan Works Football Championship: 1963, 1964
All Japan Inter-City Football Championship: 1957, 1962
Kyushu Soccer League: 1992

Affiliated clubs 
Nippon Steel Oita S.C.
Nippon Steel Kamaishi S.C.
Nippon Steel Muroran S.C.

Notes

External links
Club's Profile at JSL Ganbare!
Article on Yahata Steel (Nishinippon Shimbun)

Defunct football clubs in Japan
Japan Soccer League clubs
Association football clubs established in 1950
Association football clubs disestablished in 1999
Sport in Kitakyushu
Emperor's Cup winners
Sports teams in Fukuoka Prefecture
1950 establishments in Japan
1999 disestablishments in Japan
Works association football clubs in Japan